Dreamlab is an Australian record producing and songwriting team, composed of Daniel James and Leah Haywood, based in Los Angeles. The team's genres range from pop and dance to hip hop.

Career 

James and Haywood initially began as a collaboration, releasing their self-titled EP Dreamlab. Dreamlab later became their production and songwriting team name. Before moving into Dreamlab productions, Haywood received success in mainstream music as a Singer-songwriter with her debut album Leah. In 2001 Haywood was nominated for Best Female Artist as well as Most Performed Australian Work for her hit single "We Think It's Love" at the Australian Recording Industry Association (ARIA) awards. Around this time James moved to the band 'Receiver' as the lead vocalist, touring the United States and Australia.

After relocating from Australia to Los Angeles, Dreamlab's initial success came with producing a majority of the debut release of Aly and AJ, "Into the Rush". The album was later certified Platinum by the RIAA. From then Dreamlab has gone on to coproduce and cowrite for Grammy Award nominated artists Demi Lovato, Nicki Minaj, Selena Gomez, Miley Cyrus, Vanessa Hudgens, and in 2011 wrote and produced three songs from the Girls' Generation self titled Double platinum selling album. Haywood has also performed background vocals for Britney Spears and Celine Dion. In 2011 dreamlab set up the imprint, Layer Cake Records, with their first signing being Hunter Parrish.

Discography

References 

Australian record producers